Guy Bacon (13 February 1936 – 24 December 2018) was a politician in Quebec, Canada.  He was a Member of the National Assembly (MNA).

Background

He was born on February 13, 1936, in Trois-Rivières, and he is the brother of Senator Lise Bacon. Bacon died on 24 December 2018.

Political career

Bacon ran as a Liberal candidate in the district of Trois-Rivières in 1970, and won against Union Nationale incumbent Gilles Gauthier.

He became Parliamentary Assistant in 1973 and was re-elected in the same year.  In 1976 though, he was defeated by Parti Québécois candidate Denis Vaugeois.

Footnotes

1936 births
2018 deaths
Quebec Liberal Party MNAs
People from Trois-Rivières